Treasure (titled Celtic Treasure in some countries) is the third internationally released album by Christchurch, New Zealand soprano Hayley Westenra, released in 2007. The album celebrates Westenra's Irish roots by covering Irish songs like "Danny Boy" and religious classics like "Whispering Hope", "The Heart Worships", while also including three new songs which Hayley has co-written.

Treasure became Westenra's fourth album to hit #1 on the New Zealand music charts, and her third album to debut at #1 on the New Zealand music charts, making her the most successful female album artist in the history of the Official New Zealand Music Charts. The album spent five weeks in the number 1 position on the New Zealand charts.

Treasure became Westenra's second album to chart in the US and peaked within the Top 10 in the UK (it was the second highest new entry its debut week).

A special edition of the album released in Westenra's native New Zealand includes that country's national anthem God Defend New Zealand.

Track listing

US, Australia, New Zealand and Canadian version
 Let Me Lie
 Scarborough Fair
 Shenandoah
 Summer Fly
 Whispering Hope
 Danny Boy
 Summer Rain
 The Last Rose of Summer
 One Fine Day
 Sonny
 The Water Is Wide
 Melancholy Interlude
 Abide with Me

UK and International version

United Kingdom iTunes version
 Let Me Lie
 Le Notte De Silenzio
 Shenandoah
 Whispering Hope
 Summer Rain
 Danny Boy
 One Fine Day
 Santa Lucia
 The Heart Worships
 E Pari Ra
 Sonny
 Summer Fly
 Melancholy Interlude
 Bist Du Bei Mir
 Abide With Me
 Jekyll theme song (digital bonus version only)
 The Last Rose of Summer (iTunes bonus version only)

New Zealand special edition
 Let Me Lie
 Scarborough Fair
 Shenandoah
 Summer Fly
 Whispering Hope
 Danny Boy
 Summer Rain
 The Last Rose of Summer
 One Fine Day
 Sonny
 The Water is Wide
 Melancholy Interlude
 Abide With Me
 Le Notte De Silenzio
 E Pari Ra
 Bist Du Bei Mir
 The Heart Worships
 Santa Lucia
 God Defend New Zealand

Charts

Certifications

References

Hayley Westenra albums
2007 albums